Reloaded is a 2009 Nigerian romantic drama film directed by Lancelot Oduwa Imasuen & Ikechukwu Onyeka, starring
Ramsey Nouah, Rita Dominic, Desmond Elliot, Stephanie Okereke, Ini Edo and Nse Ikpe Etim. It received 3 nominations at the 5th Africa Movie Academy Awards.

Cast
Ramsey Nouah as Femi
Desmond Elliot as Osita
Rita Dominic as Chelsea
Stephanie Okereke as Weyinmi
Ini Edo as Tayo
Van Vicker as Bube
Uche Jombo as Tracy
Nse Ikpe Etim as Omoze
Monalisa Chinda as Abbey
Enyinna Nwigwe as Edwin
Mbong Amata (née Odungide) as Nira
Temisan Isioma Etsede as Otis
Emeka Duru as Gabriel
Princess Anazodo as Bube's Mum
Ahmed Aitity as Shola
Martha Iwoo as Ifeyinwa
Ikechukwu Onyeka as Doctor

Reception
Nollywood Reinvented gave it a 3 out of 5 star rating. The reviewer remarked that although he has seen the film several times, he never gets tired of it. NollywoodForever gave it a 93% rating. The reviewer praised the movie's pacing and flow, and enjoyed the dance scene at the end.

See also
 List of Nigerian films of 2009

References

2009 films
English-language Nigerian films
2009 romantic drama films
Nigerian romantic drama films
2000s English-language films